Vasile Suciu (13 January 1873, Kopacsel, Fogaras County – 25 January 1935, Blaj) was a Romanian Greek-Catholic  Metropolitan bishop of the Archdiocese of Făgăraș and Alba Iulia, considered to be the most important theologian of the Greek-Catholic Church in Transylvania.

After completing high school in Blaj, he pursued his theological studies in Rome at the  Propaganda Fide, obtaining Ph.D.s in Philosophy (1894) and Theology (1898).

In 1919, he was elected honorary member of the Romanian Academy.

On 1 January 1920, Vasile Suciu was appointed Metropolitan, with approval from the Vatican, and with consent from King Ferdinand I of Romania. During his tenure, a Concordat between the Holy See and the Kingdom of Romania was signed on 10 May 1927, and ratified on 7 July 1929 by the Iuliu Maniu government.

Works
 "Hipnotism și spiritism", Studiu critici-teologic, Blaj, 1906, 198 p.
 "Teologia Dogmatică fundamentală", 2 vol., Blaj, 1907 (vol.I. "Apologetica creștină", VI + 387 p.; vol. II. "Tradițiunea și Biserica", 402 p.; ed. a II-a, Blaj, 1927, 516 + 522 p.)
 "Teologia Dogmatică  specială", 2 vol., Blaj, 1908 (vol.I, "Dumnezeu unul. Sfânta Treime.  Dumnezeu Creatorul. Întruparea Domnului.  Grația", 606 p., vol. II. "Sacramentele în general. Sacramentele în special.  Eshatologia", 604 p., ed. a II-a, Blaj, 1927, 631 + 700 p.)

External links
   Archbishop Vasile (Basile) Suciu at Catholic-hierarchy.org
   "Vasile Suciu, mitropolit", at CrestinOrtodox.ro
   "Biserica Română Unită între cele două războaie mondiale" , at BRU.ro
   "Comemorarea Mitropolitului Vasile Suciu", Catholica, Blaj, January 26, 2005
 "Archeparcy of Alba Iulia and Făgăraş"

1873 births
1935 deaths
People from Brașov County
Honorary members of the Romanian Academy
Romanian Austro-Hungarians
Primates of the Romanian Greek Catholic Church
19th-century Eastern Catholic bishops
19th-century Romanian people
20th-century Eastern Catholic archbishops
20th-century Romanian people
Delegates of the Great National Assembly of Alba Iulia
Eastern Catholic bishops in Romania